The 2013 Fordham Rams football team represented Fordham University in the 2013 NCAA Division I FCS football season. They were led by second year head coach Joe Moorhead and played their home games at Coffey Field. They were a member of the Patriot League.

Fordham was not eligible for the Patriot League championship because they use scholarship players while the rest of the league's members do not. Fordham's official conference record was 0–0 and did not occupy a spot in the conference standings. Though ineligible for the conference title, Fordham finished 11–1 to earn an at-large bid in the FCS playoffs where they defeated Sacred Heart in the first round before losing in the second round to Towson.

Fordham finished the season ranked 9th in the country. Its highest FCS ranking ever.

Schedule

Source: Schedule

Ranking movements

References

Fordham
Fordham Rams football seasons
Fordham
Fordham Rams football